The 2015–16 season was Watford's 135th year in existence and first season back in the Premier League after gaining promotion the previous season. This season Watford participated in the Premier League, FA Cup and League Cup. The season covers the period from 1 July 2015 to 30 June 2016.

Pre-season friendlies
On 14 May 2015, Watford announced they would travel to Wimbledon on 11 July in a pre-season friendly. On 10 June, a trip to Germany was confirmed. On 18 June, the Hornets announced 2015 UEFA Europa League winners Sevilla would visit on 1 August. A day later, a fifth pre-season friendly was confirmed against Cardiff City. On 1 July, Watford announced they will kick pre-season off with a trip to St Albans City. On 10 July, the Hornets confirmed they would travel to Scotland to face Dundee United on 25 July.

Competitions

Overall

Overview 

{| class="wikitable" style="text-align: center"
|-
!rowspan=2|Competition
!colspan=8|Record
|-
!
!
!
!
!
!
!
!
|-
| Premier League

|-
| FA Cup

|-
| League Cup

|-
! Total

Premier League

League table

Results summary

Results by matchday

Matches
On 17 June 2015, the fixtures for the forthcoming season were announced.

FA Cup

League Cup 

Watford entered the competition in the second round and were drawn away to Preston North End.

Staff

Squad information and statistics

No. = Squad number

Pos = Playing position

P = Number of games played

G = Number of goals scored

 = Yellow cards

GK = Goalkeeper

DF = Defender

MF = Midfielder

FW = Forward

 = Red cards

Yth = Whether player went through Watford's youth system

Joined club = Year that player became a Watford first team player

Age = Current age

 Loan player

Statistics correct as of 2 April 2016.

Non-playing staff

Information correct as of 24 May 2016.

Transfers

In

Out

Loans in

Loans out

Reserves and academy
Watford's academy in 2015–16 consists of 17 scholars:
 In the second year: Jacob Cook, Andrew Eleftheriou, Michael Folivi, Nathan Gartside, Max Makaka, Brandon Mason, Ogo Obi, Charlie Rowan and Connor Stevens.
 In the first year: Denílson Carvalho, Ashley Charles, Treon Johnson, Dion Pereira, Joshua Roe, Louis Rogers, Max Ryan, David Sesay and Andrew Thomas.

In September 2014 and February 2015 respectively, strikers Ogo Obi and Michael Folivi signed agreements for one-year professional contracts to start at the end of their scholarships.

References

Watford
Watford F.C. seasons